Guddu may refer to:
 Guddu (film), a 1995 Indian Hindi film
 Guddu (cartoon character), character in an Indian webcomic
 Guddu, Pakistan, a town in Sindh, Pakistan
 Guddu, 2022 Pakistani TV serial
  Guddu, Pakistani film archivist